Events from the year 1869 in Denmark.

Incumbents
 Monarch – Christian IX
 Prime minister – C. E. Frijs

Events

 4 February – Kjøbenhavns Skøjteløberforening, Denmark's oldest ice skating club, is founded.
 1 June – the telephone company Det Store Nordiske Telegrafselskab A/S, present-day GN Store Nord A/S, is founded as the result of merging three recently established telephone companies.
 5 June – the equestrian statue of Frederick VII in the central square in Køge is inaugurated.
 2 July – the first issue of Vestjylland eller Herning Folkeblad, present-day Herning Folkeblad, is published.
 28 July – Crown Prince Frederick, the future King Frederick VIII, marries Princess Louise of Sweden at the Royal Palace in Stockholm, Sweden.
 12 August The engagement party of the crown prince and future crown princess takes place in the Knight's Hall at Christiansborg Palace.
 18 September – the Randers–Aalborg line, a newly completed railroad stretch between Randers and Aalborg, is inaugurated.
 22 September – the 1869 Folketing election is held; the Mellem Party becomes the biggest party by winning 27 seats. C. E. Frijs remains Prime Minister.

Date unknown

 Rud. Rasmussen, a wooden furniture manufacturing company, is founded.
 An international archeology congress visits the Sølager archeological site at Gundested.

Births

January–June
 2 January – Carl Moltke, Danish nobleman, minister to the United States in 1908, Minister of Foreign Affairs 1924–1926 (died 1935)
 26 March – Hans Munch-Petersen, scholar (died 1934)
 6 April – Thomas Bærentzen, sculptor (died 1936)
 28 April – Christian Geisler, organist and composer (died 1951)
 7 June – Ole Olsen, sport shooter, Olympic bronze medalist in team free rifle at the 1912 Summer Olympics (died 1944)
 26 June – Martin Andersen Nexø, socialist, later communist, writer (died 1954)

July–December
 3 July – Svend Kornbeck, stage and film actor (died 1933)
 13 July – Christian Schrøder, film actor (died 1940)
 13 August – Carl Peter Hermann Christensen, Denmark's last executioner (died 1936)
 11 November – Jens Birkholm, genre and landscape painter associated with the Funen Painters (died 1915)
 23 November – Valdemar Poulsen, engineer who developed a magnetic wire recorder (died 1942)
 6 December – Elna Borch, naturalism and symbolism sculptor (died 1950)
 7 December – Ole Bendixen, explorer, merchant and author (died 1958)
 18 December – Peter Esben-Petersen, entomologist (died 1942)
 21 December – Christian Klengenberg, whaler, trapper and trader (died 1931)
 26 December – August Blom, film director, production leader and pioneer of silent films (died 1947)

Deaths
  11 March – Christian August, Duke of Augustenborg, claimant of the provinces of Slesvig and Holstein (born 1798)
 2 April – Frederik Treschow, supreme court attorney, politician, landowner and philanthropist (born 1786)
 5 October – Adolph Peter Adler, theologian (born 1812)
 22 May – Anton Eduard Kieldrup, landscape painter (born 1826)
 14 December – Fritz Melbye, marine painter (born 1826)

References

 
Denmark
1860s in Denmark
Years of the 19th century in Denmark